Thomas Stewart Baker (born 20 January 1934) is an English actor and writer. He is well known for his portrayal of the fourth incarnation of the Doctor in the science fiction television series Doctor Who from 1974 to 1981.

Later in his career, Baker performed in the television series Medics (1992–1995), Randall & Hopkirk (Deceased) (2000–2001) and Monarch of the Glen (2004–2005). He also provided narration for the television comedy series Little Britain (2003–2006) and Little Britain USA (2008). His voice, which has been described as "sonorous", was voted the fourth-most recognisable in the UK in 2006.

Early life 
Thomas Stewart Baker was born on Scotland Road in the Vauxhall area of Liverpool on 20 January 1934. His mother, Mary Jane (née Fleming), was a cleaner and devout Catholic. His father, John Stewart Baker, was a seaman and was largely absent from the family due to being away at sea. 

Baker attended Cheswardine Hall Boarding School in Shropshire. At age 15, he became a novice religious brother with the Brothers of Ploermel (Brothers of Christian Instruction) in Jersey and later in Shropshire. He left the monastery six years later after losing his faith. In his autobiography, he said he had realised that he wanted to break each of the Ten Commandments—in order—so he thought he should get out before he did something serious. 

He undertook his national service in the Royal Army Medical Corps, serving from 1955 until 1957. Upon leaving the army, he served in the Merchant Navy.

He took up acting around 1956, joining the Rose Bruford College of Speech and Drama in Sidcup. He became a professional actor in the late 1960s.

Career

Early work 
Baker was in his thirties when his professional acting career began and he worked in provincial rep theatre. He had his first break whilst performing in a late-night pub revue for the 1968 York Festival. His performance was seen by someone with the Royal National Theatre who encouraged him to audition for the company, which was headed at the time by Laurence Olivier. Baker did so and was offered a contract. From 1968 to 1971, he was given small parts and understudied; one of his bigger roles was the horse Rosinante in Don Quixote.

Baker's stage work led to work on television, where he gained small parts in series such as Dixon of Dock Green, Z-Cars, Market in Honey Lane and Softly, Softly. His first major film role was as Grigori Rasputin in the film Nicholas and Alexandra (1971), which he got after Olivier had recommended him for the part. He was nominated for two Golden Globe Awards for his performance, one for Best Actor in a Supporting Role and another for Best Newcomer. Baker appeared as Moore, an artist whose paintings are imbued with voodoo power, in The Vault of Horror (1973), and as Koura, the villainous sorcerer, in Ray Harryhausen's The Golden Voyage of Sinbad (1973).

Baker also appeared in Pier Paolo Pasolini's 1972 film version of Geoffrey Chaucer's The Canterbury Tales, as the younger husband of the Wife of Bath.

Doctor Who 

In 1974, Baker took over the role of the Doctor from Jon Pertwee to become the Fourth Doctor in the BBC TV series. He had been recommended to producer Barry Letts by the BBC's Head of Serials, Bill Slater, who had directed Baker in a Play of the Month production of Shaw's play The Millionairess. Letts was impressed by Baker upon meeting him, and then, after seeing his performance in The Golden Voyage of Sinbad, became convinced he was right for the part. Baker was working on a construction site at the time, as acting jobs were scarce. When he first took on the role, the media dubbed him "Boiler Suit Tom" because he had been supplied for a press conference with some old studio-set clothes to replace his modest garments. Letts left the series after producing Baker's debut story, Robot (1974–75), and was replaced by Philip Hinchcliffe. Under Hinchcliffe and script editor Robert Holmes the series gained a "Gothic tone" influenced by Hammer Film Productions and, according to Hinchcliffe, was aimed "a bit more to the adults in the audience".

Baker quickly made the part his own, and audience-viewing figures for his first few years returned to a level not seen since the height of 'Dalekmania' a decade earlier. His eccentric style of dress and quirky personality (particularly his trademark look—-wearing a long scarf—and his a fondness for jelly babies), as well as his voice, made him an immediately recognisable figure, and he quickly caught the viewing public's imagination. Baker contributed ideas for many aspects of his Doctor's personality; he became known for making "frequent and often comedic scripting suggestions and ad-libs", but the idea of wearing a scarf had been created by accident. James Acheson, the costume designer assigned to his first story, had provided far more wool than necessary to the knitter, Begonia Pope, thinking this would enable her to choose a suitable colour. However, due to a miscommunication, Pope knitted all the wool she was given.

During his period as the star of Doctor Who, the original series received its highest viewing figures. Baker played the Doctor for seven consecutive seasons, making him the longest-serving actor in the part, and his incarnation is often regarded as the most popular of the Doctors. According to BBC News in 2006, in polls conducted by Doctor Who Magazine, Baker only lost the "Best Doctor" category to Sylvester McCoy in 1990 and to David Tennant in 2006. In a 2010 interview, Baker said that he had not watched Tennant's performance as the Doctor but thought his Hamlet was excellent. Many of the stories from his early period in the role are considered to be classics of the series, including The Ark in Space (1975), Genesis of the Daleks (1975), The Brain of Morbius (1976), The Deadly Assassin (1976) and The Robots of Death (1977). However, the violent tone of the stories produced by Philip Hinchcliffe saw the series come under heavy criticism from morality campaigner Mary Whitehouse. Concerns over violence during this early period led to a lightening of the tone and an "erratic decline" in both the popularity and quality of the series. In a 2014 interview, Baker described Hinchcliffe as "amazing" and identified that as his favourite time on the series. He described Hinchcliffe's successor, Graham Williams, as "absolutely devoted" but said he lacked his predecessor's flair and had "let me get away with murder". He acknowledged that his final producer on the series, John Nathan-Turner, had made changes he did not agree with and that they "did not see eye-to-eye really about very much"; however, according to Baker, the two became good friends afterwards and forgot their disagreements. Baker additionally criticised season 18, his last on the show and Nathan-Turner's first as producer, for the decision to increase the number of actors in the regular cast, which Baker felt resulted in stories that relied too much on the Doctor (rather than on other principal characters) to drive the plot forward. Baker ultimately suggested that he may have stayed in the role for one series too many, stating that, in hindsight, he felt it would have been better for him to have left with Williams and let Nathan-Turner recast the role of the Doctor for season 18.

According to Baker in 2017, "When I was doing Doctor Who, it was the realisation of all my childhood fantasies... so I took to it like a duck to water, and I still do. Doctor Who was more important than life to me—I used to dread the end of rehearsal... that's why I can't stay away from it." Although Baker declined to appear in the 20th anniversary Doctor Who episode The Five Doctors (1983) because it wasn't long since he'd left and he "didn't want to play 20 per cent of the part" and be "a feed for other Doctors", he briefly returned to the role of the Doctor for the 30th anniversary charity special Dimensions in Time (1993) and also recorded the audio for the PC video game Doctor Who: Destiny of the Doctors (1997). Baker continued to be associated with the Doctor, appearing on documentaries such as the 40th anniversary BBC television retrospective The Story of Doctor Who (2003) and giving other interviews about his time on the programme, including for documentaries on the extras of Doctor Who DVD releases from his era as the Doctor, and he has recorded DVD commentaries for many of the stories.

Baker was also involved in the reading of old Target novelisations in the BBC Audio range of talking books, "Doctor Who (Classic Novels)". Doctor Who and the Giant Robot was the first release in the range read by Baker, released on 5 November 2007, followed by Baker reading Doctor Who and the Brain of Morbius (released 4 February 2008), Doctor Who and the Creature from the Pit (released on 7 April 2008) and Doctor Who and the Pyramids of Mars (released 14 August 2008). In October 2009, Baker was interviewed for BBC Radio 4's Last Word to pay tribute to the deceased former Doctor Who producer Barry Letts. He described Letts, who originally cast him in the role, as "the big link in changing my entire life".

On 20 November 2013, Baker revealed that he would appear in the 50th-anniversary special, "The Day of the Doctor", stating, "I am in the special. I'm not supposed to tell you that, but I tell you that very willingly and specifically; the BBC told me not to tell anybody but I'm telling you straight away." The episode saw Baker in the role of a mysterious curator in the National Gallery who openly discusses his resemblance to the Fourth Doctor with the Eleventh Doctor.

Baker also filmed inserts in 1992 for a video release of the unfinished Douglas Adams Doctor Who serial Shada, originally begun in 1979 but abandoned due to strike action, and presented the video release The Tom Baker Years (1992), which was a look back at his time on the series with Baker watching short clips from his episodes. In November 2017, Baker returned to the Doctor role by completing Shada. Animation was added to complete the original story. He also filmed one new scene for inclusion in the final episode.

Doctor Who audio dramas

While Peter Davison, Colin Baker, Sylvester McCoy and Paul McGann have all reprised their roles for audio adventures produced by Big Finish Productions (and sometimes the BBC) since the 1990s, Baker declined to voice the Doctor until 2009, saying that he had not seen a script he liked. In July 2009, the BBC announced that Baker would return to the role for a series of five audio dramas, co-starring Richard Franklin as Captain Mike Yates, which would begin release in September. The five audios comprise a single linked story under the banner title Hornets' Nest, written by author Paul Magrs. He returned with a sequel to Hornets' Nest called Demon Quest.

In March 2011, it was announced that Baker would be returning as the Fourth Doctor initially for two series of plays for Big Finish Productions, starring alongside former companions Leela (Louise Jameson) and Romana I (Mary Tamm). The first series of six audios were released starting in January 2012. Big Finish had also arranged for Baker to record a series of stories reuniting him with Elisabeth Sladen's character Sarah Jane Smith (for which special permission was obtained from the producers of The Sarah Jane Adventures TV series), but Sladen died in April 2011 before any stories could be recorded. Baker recently recorded several Big Finish audio stories with Matthew Waterhouse, who played Adric, and Lalla Ward, who played Romana II (though Ward recorded her sections separately).

It was reported in April 2020 that Baker had recorded "Return of the Cybermen" for Big Finish, an alternative version of the story Revenge of the Cybermen (1975), with Sadie Miller, Elisabeth Sladen's daughter, taking over the role of Sarah Jane Smith from her mother. The story was released in March 2021.

Baker also returned to the role of the Curator for Big Finish, joining the casts of The Eighth Doctor Adventures and UNIT: The New Series.

Later film and television work 

In 1982, Baker portrayed Sherlock Holmes in a four-part BBC1 miniseries version of The Hound of the Baskervilles; in the US, this production was telecast on A&E. He also made an appearance in Blackadder II, in the episode "Potato", as the sea captain "Redbeard Rum". He played Puddleglum, a "marsh-wiggle", in the 1990 BBC adaptation of C. S. Lewis' The Silver Chair.

For the third series of the British game show Cluedo, Baker was cast as Professor Plum, a "man with a degree in suspicion". He was also cast in the 2004 series Strange, as a blind priest who possessed knowledge of the Devil. In addition, he played the part of Donald MacDonald in the BBC series Monarch of the Glen, from 2004 until 2005. Previously, he had appeared as a guest on the quiz show Have I Got News For You and was subsequently described by presenter Angus Deayton as the funniest guest in the series' history. A particular highlight was when Baker gave an anecdotal account of how, while entering a recording studio in Wales, he was accosted by a member of the public who told Baker: "I will never forgive you, nor will my wife, for what you did to our grammar schools." Baker responded with: "What are you talking about, you daft bugger?" to which the stranger replied: "I'm so sorry. For a moment I thought you were Shirley Williams."

Baker later returned to Have I Got News For You as a guest host in 2008. Baker played the role of the Captain in the Challenge version of Fort Boyard, and has also hosted the children's literature series, The Book Tower. He recorded a special called, Tom Baker – In Confidence that was shown in April 2010.

In the late 1990s, it was reported that Baker was a candidate for the role of Gandalf in the Lord of the Rings films. Baker has since stated that he was only approached for "a role" in the film, and turned down the offer when told that it would mean spending months away in New Zealand. He appeared as Halvarth, the Elven healer, in Dungeons & Dragons (2000).

Little Britain 

After his work on Lionel Nimrod's Inexplicable World, Baker was cast as a similar narrator of Little Britain on BBC Radio 4 and remained in the role when it transferred to television. He has suggested that he was chosen for the part in Little Britain due to his popularity with creators Matt Lucas and David Walliams, part of the generation for whom he is the favourite Doctor. "I am now being employed by the children who grew up watching me", he stated in a DVD commentary. Another trademark of Little Britains narration is the deadpan quotation of old rap lyrics, usually in the opening credit sequence. On 17 November 2005, to mark the start of the third series of Little Britain, Baker read the continuity announcements on BBC One from 7 pm to 9:30 pm GMT. The scripts were written by Lucas and Walliams; Baker assumed his Little Britain persona. He used lines such as:

Voice acting 
Baker has appeared in various radio productions, including a role as "Britain's most celebrated criminal barrister", Sir Edward Marshall-Hall in John Mortimer Presents the Trials of Marshall Hall (1996), "Josiah Bounderby" in Charles Dickens' Hard Times (1998) and a part in the 2001 BBC Radio 4 version of The Thirty-Nine Steps as Sir Walter Bullivant. He guest starred in The Further Adventures of Sherlock Holmes (a pastiche series written by Bert Coules) in the 2002 episode "The Saviour of Cripplegate Square". From 2000 to 2005 Baker voiced the character Max Bear in the Channel 4 (UK) Max Bear Productions animated series. He also voiced the role of the villain ZeeBad in the 2005 computer-animated film version of The Magic Roundabout. In 2007 he voiced the character of Robert Baron in the BBC animated series The Secret Show.

Baker narrated the children's computer-animated series The Beeps which was shown on Channel 5's Milkshake! as well as narrating Tales of Aesop on BBC, a television series with puppetry based on Aesop's Fables. Most recently, Baker has returned to the role of the Fourth Doctor, first in three series of audio adventures for BBC Audiobooks: Hornet's Nest, Demon Quest and Serpents' Crest; and now in a new series of Doctor Who audio adventures for Big Finish Productions also starring Louise Jameson as "Leela". There were seven releases in 2013 with Mary Tamm as Romana: (The Auntie Matter, The Sands of Life, War Against the Laan, The Justice of Jalxar, Phantoms of the Deep, The Dalek Contract and The Final Phase). Subsequent series also feature Baker alongside John Leeson as K9, Lalla Ward as the second incarnation of Romana and Matthew Waterhouse as Adric, all reprising their television roles.

In the third season of the animated series Star Wars Rebels, Baker provided the voice of Bendu, a powerful Force-sensitive being.

Video games 
Baker starred as the Fourth Doctor in the 1997 video game Destiny of the Doctors where he provided the voice. His voice has also been featured in Ecco the Dolphin: Defender of the Future (2000), Warhammer 40,000: Fire Warrior (2003), Sudeki (2004), Cold Winter (2005), : Resurrection, Hostile Waters: Antaeus Rising, and Little Britain: The Video Game (2007).

Narration 
Baker is a prolific voiceover artist and his voice was voted as the fourth most recognisable in the UK in 2006 after the Queen, Tony Blair and Margaret Thatcher.
In 1992 and 1993, Baker narrated BBC radio comedy series Lionel Nimrod's Inexplicable World. In 1994 he provided the narration for Channel 4's Equinox rave documentary Rave New World. In 2002 he had a speaking role in the critically acclaimed but commercially unsuccessful Hostile Waters as the Narrator.

He voiced both the narrator and the god "Tetsu" in the role-playing game Sudeki, but was uncredited. During the first three months of 2006, his voice was used by BT for spoken delivery of text messages to landline phones. He recorded 11,593 phrases, containing every sound in the English language, for use by the text-to-speech service. The BT text message service returned from 1 December 2006 until 8 January 2007, with two pence from each text going to the charity Shelter. Also, a single "sung" by Baker's text voice, "You Really Got Me" by The Kinks, was released on 18 December 2006 with proceeds going to the charity. The creator of the song was Mark Murphy, designer of the site.

Baker's voice may be heard at London's Natural History Museum narrating commentary to some of the exhibits that demonstrate Darwin's theory of natural selection. He has made three other brief forays into the world of music: he provides the monologue to the track "Witness to a Murder (Part Two)" on the album Six by Mansun; he appears on Technocat's single "Only Human" in 1995, and in 2002 he recorded the monologue to the track "Megamorphosis" on the album Andabrek by Stephen James, although the album was not released until 2009. Baker provides narrative at two British tourist attractions: the Nemesis roller coaster at Alton Towers, Staffordshire; and the London Dungeon, a museum depicting gory and macabre events in the capital, narrating the events leading up to and comprising the Great Fire of London.

Baker voiced the character "Max Bear", a series of animated stories broadcast on Channel 4 (UK Terrestrial) from 2000 to 2005. He narrated Australian cartoonist Bruce Petty's 2006 film about world politics, Global Haywire.

Books 
Baker's autobiography, Who on Earth is Tom Baker? was published in 1997 and made available on Kindle devices in September 2013.

Baker has also written a short fairytale-style novel called The Boy Who Kicked Pigs. In 1981 he edited a collection of poems for children: Never Wear Your Wellies in the House and Other Poems to Make You Laugh.

In 2019 Baker released a Doctor Who novel called Scratchman. Co-written with James Goss, the novel is based on a script Tom Baker and Ian Marter wrote for a Doctor Who film in the 1970s. The plot involves the Fourth Doctor meeting Scratchman who may be the devil.

Theatre 
In 1966 Baker became a member of Frank Dunlop’s Pop Theatre Company production of Shakespeare’s The Winter's Tale, which was performed at that year's Edinburgh International Festival and in the Cambridge Theatre, London. Other cast members included “Carry On...” stalwart Jim Dale and up-and-coming actress Jane Asher: Baker played several small roles within the play, including the infamous “bear”.

Baker joined the National Theatre in 1968 as an understudy for Rosencrantz and Guildenstern are Dead followed by small parts in The National Health by Peter Nichols (directed by Michael Blakemore).

After playing the horse in The Travails of Sancho Panza (directed by Joan Plowright), Laurence Olivier subsequently cast him as the Prince of Morocco in The Merchant of Venice. The play was directed by Jonathan Miller, with Baker appearing alongside Olivier as Shylock. Still under contract at the National, Baker also played a Russian in The Idiot, Sir Frances Acton in A Woman Killed With Kindness, opposite Anthony Hopkins, and Filippo in The Rules of the Game.

After leaving the role of The Doctor in 1981, Baker returned to theatre to play Oscar Wilde in Feasting with Panthers at the Chichester Festival Theatre. The following year, he played Judge Brack in Hedda Gabler, with Susannah York as Hedda, in the West End. Also in 1982, Baker played Dr. Frank Bryant in a Royal Shakespeare Company production of Educating Rita, alongside Kate Fitzgerald as Rita. He returned to the National Theatre in 1984 to play Mr Hardcastle in She Stoops to Conquer in the Olivier Theatre and on a later tour. The following year he played both Sherlock Holmes and Moriarty in The Mask of Moriarty by Hugh Leonard at the Gate Theatre in Dublin.

In 1987 Baker played Inspector Goole in a revival production of An Inspector Calls directed by Peter Dews.

Music 
In 1998, Baker provided narration on the track Witness to a Murder (Part 2) on the album Six by the English alternative rockband Mansun.

On 13 May 2020, Dutch producer and songwriter Arjen Anthony Lucassen announced that Baker would provide spoken vocals for the character of "The Storyteller" on Ayreon's album, Transitus.

Personal life 
Baker's first marriage was in 1961, to Anna Wheatcroft, niece of rose grower Harry Wheatcroft; they had met and started dating whilst at acting school. They had two sons and divorced in 1966. Baker lost contact with his sons until a chance meeting with Piers in a New Zealand pub allowed them to renew their relationship. In December 1980, he married Lalla Ward, who had co-starred in Doctor Who as his character's companion Romana. They divorced in April 1982.

Baker married for a third time on 1 April 1986, to Sue Jerrard, who had been an assistant editor on Doctor Who. They moved to the Bell House, a converted school in Boughton Malherbe, Kent, where they kept several cats before moving to France in January 2003. They sold the property to Jim Moir ('Vic Reeves') shortly after Baker had worked with him on the BBC revival of Randall and Hopkirk. In November 2006, Baker bought a house in Royal Tunbridge Wells, Kent, before later moving to Rye, East Sussex.

Baker is cynical of religion and describes himself as irreligious, or occasionally as Buddhist, but not anti-religious. Politically, Baker has expressed disdain for the Conservative Party and New Labour, saying in 1998, "when the Conservatives were in I cannot tell you how much I hated them, but I realise how shallow I am because I now hate the Labour Party as much."

Popular culture 
 English synthpop band the Human League recorded a track entitled "Tom Baker". In 1981 it was released as the B-side to their "Boys and Girls" single. The instrumental track was re-released on some CD versions of their Travelogue album. The song was inspired by the incidental music of Doctor Who.
 A cartoon of Tom Baker, as the Fourth Doctor, appeared as one of the "esteemed representatives of television" in The Simpsons episodes "Sideshow Bob's Last Gleaming", "Treehouse of Horror X", and "Mayored to the Mob". A fan of Doctor Who since childhood, Simpsons creator Matt Groening favours Tom Baker’s Doctor. Simpsons writer Ron Hauge said, "There are several Doctor Who actors but Tom Baker is the one we always go with."
 Impressionist Jon Culshaw regularly impersonates Baker in the comedy series Dead Ringers. On one episode of Dead Ringers, Culshaw called Baker himself using his impersonation, introducing himself as the Doctor. An amused Baker replied, "No, there must be a mistake. I'm the Doctor!"
 A fictional version of Baker appears in the Kevin Sampson novel Awaydays. In this story, he is attending the seventh International Doctor Who Convention in Halifax in December 1979, where the chief protagonists of the novel (a group of Tranmere Rovers hooligans) accidentally gatecrash. They befriend him and try to persuade him to tour the country as the Doctor sets fire to his farts. This scene was not included in the film version of the novel. In the DVD of the film the producer wanted to include extras with scenes of Baker in Doctor Who in it from the time but the BBC was not forthcoming because of the violent nature of the film.

Filmography

Film

Television

Video games

Radio

Audio dramas

Publications

Discography

References

External links 

 
 
 
 Tom Baker Biography – British Film Institute
 Tom Baker as Doctor Who in Denis Allen Print Birthday Cards circa 1978 at Doctor Who Appreciation Society Online Archive

1934 births
Living people
Military personnel from Liverpool
20th-century British Army personnel
20th-century English male actors
21st-century English male actors
Alumni of Rose Bruford College
Audiobook narrators
Converts to Buddhism from Roman Catholicism
English Buddhists
English humanists
English male film actors
English male radio actors
English male stage actors
English male television actors
English male voice actors
English people of Irish descent
English people of Scottish descent
Little Britain
Male actors from Liverpool
People from Boughton Malherbe
People from Rye, East Sussex
People from Vauxhall, Liverpool
Royal Army Medical Corps soldiers